Prem Suwal is a Nepalese politician, secretary to central committee of the Nepal Majdoor Kisan Party currently serving as the member of the 1st Federal Parliament of Nepal. In the 2017 Nepalese general election, he was elected from the Bhaktapur 1 constituency, securing 33076 (46.94%)  votes. He also served as the former mayor of Bhaktapur.

References

Nepal MPs 2017–2022
Living people
Nepal Workers Peasants Party politicians
1960 births
Nepal MPs 2022–present